This is a list of species in Dolichopus, a genus of long-legged flies in the family Dolichopodidae. Separate lists of synonyms are also included.

Dolichopus species
This section lists 610 valid species known in Dolichopus:

 Dolichopus abaftanus Harmston, 1966 i c g 
 Dolichopus abbreviatus Van Duzee, 1921 i c g 
 Dolichopus aboriginis Harmston & Knowlton, 1943 i c g 
 Dolichopus abrasus Van Duzee, 1921 i c g 
 Dolichopus abruptus Aldrich, 1922 i c g 
 Dolichopus absonus Van Duzee, 1921 i c g b 
 Dolichopus accidentalis Harmston & Knowlton, 1941 i c g 
 Dolichopus acricola Van Duzee, 1921 i c g 
 Dolichopus acuminatus Loew, 1861 i c g b 
 Dolichopus acutangulus Negrobov & Barkalov, 1976 c g
 Dolichopus acuticornis Wiedemann, 1817 c g
 Dolichopus acutus Van Duzee, 1921 i c g 
 Dolichopus adaequatus Van Duzee, 1921 i c g 
 Dolichopus adultus Van Duzee, 1921 i c g 
 Dolichopus aequalis Van Duzee, 1921 i c g 
 Dolichopus aeratus Van Duzee, 1921 i c g 
 Dolichopus aethiops Van Duzee, 1921 i c g b 
 Dolichopus affinis Walker, 1849 i c g
 Dolichopus affluens Van Duzee, 1921 i c g 
 Dolichopus afroungulatus Grichanov, 2004 c g
 Dolichopus agilis Meigen, 1824 c g 
 Dolichopus agronomus Melander & Brues, 1900 i c g 
 Dolichopus ainsliei Van Duzee, 1921 i c g 
 Dolichopus alacer Van Duzee, 1921 i c g b 
 Dolichopus albertensis Curran, 1922 i c g 
 Dolichopus albiciliatus Loew, 1862 i c g b 
 Dolichopus albicinctus Smirnov, 1948 c g
 Dolichopus albicoxa Aldrich, 1893 i c g b 
 Dolichopus albifrons Loew, 1859 c g
 Dolichopus albipalpus Negrobov, 1973 c g
 Dolichopus albivestitarsis Robinson, 1964 i c g 
 Dolichopus aldrichii (Wheeler, 1899) i c g 
 Dolichopus alexanderi Stackelberg, 1930
 Dolichopus altayensis Yang, 1998 c g 
 Dolichopus alticola Parent, 1930 c g
 Dolichopus amginensis Stackelberg, 1928 c g
 Dolichopus amnicola (Melander & Brues, 1900) i c g 
 Dolichopus amphericus Melander & Brues, 1900 i c g 
 Dolichopus amplipennis Van Duzee, 1921 i c g 
 Dolichopus amurensis Stackelberg, 1930 c g
 Dolichopus anacrostichus Frey, 1945 c g
 Dolichopus ancistrus Yang, 1996 c g 
 Dolichopus andalusiacus Strobl, 1899 g
 Dolichopus andersoni Curran, 1924 i c g 
 Dolichopus andorrensis Parent, 1930 c g
 Dolichopus angustatus Aldrich, 1893 i c g 
 Dolichopus angusticornis Van Duzee, 1921 i c g 
 Dolichopus angustipennis Kertesz, 1901 c g
 Dolichopus annulitarsis Ringdahl, 1920 c g 
 Dolichopus apheles Melander & Brues, 1900 i c g 
 Dolichopus apicalis Zetterstedt, 1849 c g
 Dolichopus appendiculatus Van Duzee, 1921 i c g 
 Dolichopus arbustorum Stannius, 1831 c g
 Dolichopus argentipes Van Duzee, 1921 i c g 
 Dolichopus argyrotarsis Wahlberg, 1850 g
 Dolichopus arizonicus Harmston, 1951 i c g 
 Dolichopus armeniacus Stackelberg, 1926 c g
 Dolichopus armillatus Wahlberg, 1851 c g
 Dolichopus asiaticus Negrobov, 1973 c g
 Dolichopus asymmetricus Selivanova, Negrobov & Barkalov, 2012 
 Dolichopus atratus Meigen, 1824 c g 
 Dolichopus atripes Meigen, 1824 c g 
 Dolichopus aubertini Parent, 1934 c g
 Dolichopus aurifacies Aldrich, 1893 i c g 
 Dolichopus aurifex Van Duzee, 1921 i c g b 
 Dolichopus austriacus Parent, 1927 c g
 Dolichopus bakeri Cole, 1912 i c g 
 Dolichopus barbaricus Van Duzee, 1921 i c g 
 Dolichopus barbicauda Van Duzee, 1921 i c g 
 Dolichopus barbipes Van Duzee, 1921 i c g 
 Dolichopus barkalovi Negrobov, Selivanova & Maslova, 2018
 Dolichopus barycnemus Coquillett, 1904 i c g 
 Dolichopus basalis Loew, 1859 c g
 Dolichopus basisetus Yang, 1998 c g 
 Dolichopus bayaticus Negrobov, 1976 c g
 Dolichopus beameri Harmston & Knowlton, 1941 i c g 
 Dolichopus beatus Van Duzee, 1921 i c g 
 Dolichopus beschovskii Negrobov & Kechev, 2010 
 Dolichopus bianchii Stackelberg, 1929 c g
 Dolichopus bifractus Loew, 1861 i c g b 
 Dolichopus bigeniculatus Parent, 1926 c g
 Dolichopus bilamellatus Parent, 1929 c g
 Dolichopus bisetosus Van Duzee, 1921 i c g 
 Dolichopus bisetulatus Negrobov, 1977 c g
 Dolichopus blandus Van Duzee, 1921 i c g 
 Dolichopus bolsteri Van Duzee, 1921 i c g 
 Dolichopus bonsdorffi Frey, 1915 
 Dolichopus brevicauda Van Duzee, 1921 i c g 
 Dolichopus breviciliatus Van Duzee, 1930 i c g 
 Dolichopus breviclypeus Negrobov, 1976 c g
 Dolichopus brevifacies Stackelberg, 1926 c g
 Dolichopus brevimanus Loew, 1861 i c g 
 Dolichopus brevipennis Meigen, 1824 i c g 
 Dolichopus brevipilosus Van Duzee, 1933 i c g 
 Dolichopus breviusculus Loew, 1871 c g
 Dolichopus bruesi Van Duzee, 1921 i c g 
 Dolichopus bruneifacies Van Duzee, 1933 i c g 
 Dolichopus brunneilineatus Negrobov, 1976 c g
 Dolichopus brunneus Aldrich, 1893 i c g 
 Dolichopus bryanti Van Duzee, 1921 i c g 
 Dolichopus burnesi Van Duzee, 1921 i c g 
 Dolichopus calainus Melander & Brues, 1900 i c g 
 Dolichopus calcaratus Aldrich, 1893 i c g 
 Dolichopus calceatus Parent, 1927 c g
 Dolichopus californicus Van Duzee, 1921 i c g 
 Dolichopus caligatus Wahlberg, 1850 c g
 Dolichopus calinotus Loew, 1871 c g
 Dolichopus callosus Becker, 1902 c g
 Dolichopus calvimontis James, 1939 i c g 
 Dolichopus campestris Meigen, 1824 c g 
 Dolichopus canadensis Van Duzee, 1921 i c g 
 Dolichopus canaliculatus Thomson, 1869 i c g b 
 Dolichopus carolinensis Van Duzee, 1921 i c g 
 Dolichopus cavatus Van Duzee, 1921 i c g 
 Dolichopus celeripes Van Duzee, 1921 i c g 
 Dolichopus chrysostomus Loew, 1861 i c g 
 Dolichopus cilifemoratus Macquart, 1827 c g
 Dolichopus cinctipes Wahlberg, 1850 c g
 Dolichopus ciscaucasicus Stackelberg, 1927 c g
 Dolichopus claviger Stannius, 1831 c g
 Dolichopus clavipes Haliday, 1832 c g 
 Dolichopus coercens Walker, 1849 i c g 
 Dolichopus coloradensis Aldrich, 1893 i c g 
 Dolichopus comatus Loew, 1861 i c g b 
 Dolichopus compactus Van Duzee, 1921 i c g 
 Dolichopus completus Van Duzee, 1921 i c g 
 Dolichopus comptus Van Duzee, 1921 i c g 
 Dolichopus consanguineus (Wheeler, 1899) i c g b 
 Dolichopus conspectus Van Duzee, 1921 i c g 
 Dolichopus contiguus Walker, 1849 i c g 
 Dolichopus convergens Aldrich, 1893 i c g 
 Dolichopus coquilletti Aldrich, 1893 i c g 
 Dolichopus corax Osten Sacken, 1877 i c g 
 Dolichopus correus Steyskal, 1959 i c g 
 Dolichopus costalis Frey, 1915 c g
 Dolichopus crassicornis Aldrich, 1922 i c g 
 Dolichopus crassicosta Parent, 1926 c g
 Dolichopus crassitibia Robinson, 1967 i c g 
 Dolichopus crenatus (Osten Sacken, 1877) i c g b 
 Dolichopus cuneipennis Parent, 1926 c g
 Dolichopus cuprinus Wiedemann, 1830 i c g b 
 Dolichopus czekanovskii Stackelberg, 1928 c g 
 Dolichopus dakotensis Aldrich, 1893 i c g 
 Dolichopus dasyops Malloch, 1919 i c g 
 Dolichopus dasypodus Coquillett, 1910 i c g 
 Dolichopus davshinicus Negrobov, 1973 c g
 Dolichopus decorus Van Duzee, 1921 i c g 
 Dolichopus defectus Van Duzee, 1921 i c g 
 Dolichopus delicatus Aldrich, 1922 i c g 
 Dolichopus demissus Van Duzee, 1921 i c g 
 Dolichopus detersus Loew, 1866 i c g 
 Dolichopus diadema Haliday, 1832 c g 
 Dolichopus digitus Van Duzee, 1921 i c g 
 Dolichopus discifer Stannius, 1831
 Dolichopus discimanus Wahlberg, 1850 c g
 Dolichopus discolor Van Duzee, 1921 i c g 
 Dolichopus disharmonicus Smirnov, 1948 c g
 Dolichopus distinctus Van Duzee, 1921 c g b 
 Dolichopus diversipennis Curran, 1922 i c g 
 Dolichopus divigatus Harmston, 1952 i c g 
 Dolichopus divisus Becker, 1917 c g
 Dolichopus dolosus Parent, 1934 i c g 
 Dolichopus domesticus Van Duzee, 1921 i c g b 
 Dolichopus dorsalis Van Duzee, 1921 i c g 
 Dolichopus dorycerus Loew, 1864 i c g 
 Dolichopus dracula Runyon, 2008 c g 
 Dolichopus dubrovskyi Negrobov, Maslova & Selivanova, 2019
 Dolichopus duplicatus Aldrich, 1893 i c g 
 Dolichopus efflatouni (Parent, 1925) c g
 Dolichopus elegans Aldrich, 1922 i c g 
 Dolichopus emeljanovi Stackelberg, 1930
 Dolichopus enigma Melander & Brues, 1900 i c g 
 Dolichopus eous Stackelberg, 1929
 Dolichopus erroneus Parent, 1926 c g
 Dolichopus eudactylus Loew, 1861 i c g 
 Dolichopus eurypterus Gerstaecker, 1864 c g
 Dolichopus evolvens Parent, 1929 i c g 
 Dolichopus excisus Loew, 1859 c g
 Dolichopus exsul Aldrich, 1922 i c g 
 Dolichopus facirecedens Harmston & Knowlton, 1939 i c g 
 Dolichopus factivittatus Harmston, 1966 i c g 
 Dolichopus falcatus Becker, 1917 c g
 Dolichopus fallax Van Duzee, 1933 i c g 
 Dolichopus festivus Haliday, 1832 c g 
 Dolichopus finitus Walker, 1849 i c g 
 Dolichopus flagellitenens Wheeler, 1890 i c g 
 Dolichopus flaviciliatus Van Duzee, 1921 i c g 
 Dolichopus flavicoxa Van Duzee, 1921 i c g 
 Dolichopus flavifacies Van Duzee, 1933 i c g 
 Dolichopus flavilacertus Van Duzee, 1921 i c g 
 Dolichopus flavipes Stannius, 1831 c g 
 Dolichopus flavocrinitus Becker, 1902 c g
 Dolichopus footei Harmston, 1966 i c g 
 Dolichopus formosus Van Duzee, 1921 i c g 
 Dolichopus fortis Aldrich, 1922 i c g 
 Dolichopus fraterculus Zetterstedt, 1843 c g 
 Dolichopus fridolini Stackelberg, 1928
 Dolichopus friedrichi Meuffels & Grootaert, 1999 c g 
 Dolichopus frontalis Van Duzee, 1928 i c g 
 Dolichopus fucatus Van Duzee, 1921 i c g 
 Dolichopus fulgerus Harmston, 1966 c g 
 Dolichopus fulvipes Loew, 1862 i c g 
 Dolichopus fumosus Van Duzee, 1921 i c g 
 Dolichopus funditor Loew, 1861 i c g b 
 Dolichopus fursovi Negrobov & Barkalov, 2010 
 Dolichopus fuscicercus Pollet, Khaghaninia & Kazerani, 2017 g
 Dolichopus gaigei Steyskal, 1973 i c g 
 Dolichopus galeatus Loew, 1871 c g
 Dolichopus geniculatus Stannius, 1831 c g
 Dolichopus genicupallidus Becker, 1889 c g
 Dolichopus genualis Van Duzee, 1921 i c g 
 Dolichopus gladius Van Duzee, 1921 i c g 
 Dolichopus gorodkovi Negrobov, 1973 c g
 Dolichopus grandicornis Wahlberg, 1851 c g
 Dolichopus grandis Aldrich, 1893 i c g 
 Dolichopus gratiolus Steyskal, 1973 i c g 
 Dolichopus gratus Loew, 1861 i c g b 
 Dolichopus griseifacies Becker, 1917 c g
 Dolichopus griseipennis Stannius, 1831 c g
 Dolichopus groenlandicus Zetterstedt, 1843 i c g 
 Dolichopus grootaerti Negrobov, Barkalov & Selivanova, 2014 
 Dolichopus grunini Smirnov, 1948 c g
 Dolichopus gubernator Mik, 1978 c g
 Dolichopus harbecki Van Duzee, 1921 i c g 
 Dolichopus hardyi Harmston, 1951 i c g 
 Dolichopus haritonovi Negrobov, Barkalov & Selivanova, 2012 
 Dolichopus hastatus Loew, 1864 i c g 
 Dolichopus hasynensis Negrobov, Barkalov & Selivanova, 2012 
 Dolichopus hejingensis Yang, 1998 c g 
 Dolichopus helenae James, 1939 i c g 
 Dolichopus henanus Yang, 1999 c g 
 Dolichopus hilaris Loew, 1862 c g
 Dolichopus hirsutitarsis Harmston, 1952 
 Dolichopus howjingleei Olejnicek, 2002 c g 
 Dolichopus humilis Van Duzee, 1921 i c g 
 Dolichopus ibarakiensis Negrobov, Kumazawa & Tago in Negrobov, Kumazawa, Tago & Maslova, 2015 
 Dolichopus idahoensis (Aldrich, 1894) i c g b 
 Dolichopus idoneus Van Duzee, 1921 i c g 
 Dolichopus immaculatus Becker, 1909 c g
 Dolichopus imperfectus Van Duzee, 1921 i c g 
 Dolichopus impotens Smirnov, 1948 c g
 Dolichopus incisuralis Loew, 1861 i c g 
 Dolichopus incongruus Wheeler, 1890 i c g 
 Dolichopus indianus Harmston & Knowlton, 1946 i c g 
 Dolichopus indicus Parent, 1934 c g
 Dolichopus indigenus Van Duzee, 1921 i c g 
 Dolichopus inflatus Aldrich, 1922 i c g 
 Dolichopus integripes Parent, 1929 i c g 
 Dolichopus intentus Melander & Brues, 1900 i c g 
 Dolichopus interjectus Van Duzee, 1923 i c g 
 Dolichopus intonsus Smirnov, 1948 c g
 Dolichopus iowaensis Harmston & Knowlton, 1939 i c g 
 Dolichopus ivanovi Stackelberg, 1929 c g 
 Dolichopus jacutensis Stackelberg, 1929 c g
 Dolichopus jakutus Selivanova & Negrobov, 2011 
 Dolichopus jaquesi Harmston & Knowlton, 1939 i c g 
 Dolichopus jaxarticus Stackelberg, 1927 c g
 Dolichopus jilinensis Zhang & Yang, 2008 
 Dolichopus johnsoni Aldrich, 1893 i c g 
 Dolichopus jugalis Tucker, 1911 i c g 
 Dolichopus kansensis Aldrich, 1893 i c g 
 Dolichopus kasakhstaniensis Negrobov, Selivanova & Maslova, 2014 
 Dolichopus kechevi Grichanov, 2016 
 Dolichopus kiritschenkoi Stackelberg, 1927 c g
 Dolichopus kjari Stackelberg, 1929 c g
 Dolichopus kleini Curran in Van Duzee & Curran, 1934 i c g 
 Dolichopus korobovi Negrobov, Selivanova & Maslova, 2020
 Dolichopus kosterini Grichanov, 2017 
 Dolichopus kowarzianus Stackelberg, 1928 c g
 Dolichopus kozlovi Negrobov, 1973 c g
 Dolichopus kroeberi Parent, 1929 c g
 Dolichopus kumakensis Maslova, Negrobov & Selivanova, 2016 
 Dolichopus kumazawai Maslova, Negrobov & Fursov, 2014 
 Dolichopus kurayensis Negrobov, Barkalov & Selivanova, 2011
 Dolichopus kuznetsovi Maslova, Negrobov & Selivanova, 2012 
 Dolichopus kyphotus Harmston, 1966 i c g 
 Dolichopus laciniatus Coquillett, 1910 i c g 
 Dolichopus lairdi Olejnicek, Mohsen & Ouda, 1995 c g
 Dolichopus lamellicornis Thomson, 1869 c g 
 Dolichopus lamellipes Walker, 1849 i c g 
 Dolichopus lancearius Hedstrom, 1966 c g
 Dolichopus laticola Verrall, 1904 c g
 Dolichopus laticornis Loew, 1861 i c g 
 Dolichopus latilimbatus Macquart, 1827 c g
 Dolichopus latipennis Fallén, 1823 c g 
 Dolichopus latipes (Loew, 1861) i c g 
 Dolichopus latronis Van Duzee, 1921 i c g 
 Dolichopus legendrei Parent, 1930 c g
 Dolichopus lenensis Negrobov, Barkalov & Selivanova, 2014 
 Dolichopus lepidus Staeger, 1842 c g
 Dolichopus leucacra James, 1939 i c g 
 Dolichopus leucopus Smirnov, 1948 c g
 Dolichopus linearis Meigen, 1824 c g 
 Dolichopus lineatocornis Zetterstedt, 1843 c g
 Dolichopus litoralis Van Duzee, 1921 i c g 
 Dolichopus litorellus Zetterstedt, 1852 c g
 Dolichopus lobatus Loew, 1861 i c g 
 Dolichopus lonchophorus Loew, 1873 c g
 Dolichopus longicornis Stannius, 1831 i c g 
 Dolichopus longicercus Negrobov, Selivanova & Maslova, 2018
 Dolichopus longicostalis Negrobov & Barkalov, 1978 c g
 Dolichopus longimanus Loew, 1861 i c g b 
 Dolichopus longipennis Loew, 1861 i c g b 
 Dolichopus longipilosus Zhang & Yang, 2008 
 Dolichopus longisetosus Negrobov, 1973
 Dolichopus longisetus Negrobov, 1977 c g
 Dolichopus longitarsis Stannius, 1831 c g
 Dolichopus longus Aldrich, 1922 i c g 
 Dolichopus lundbecki Curran, 1923 i c g 
 Dolichopus luoshanensis Yang & Saigusa, 2000 c g
 Dolichopus luteifacies Parent, 1927 c g
 Dolichopus luteipennis Loew, 1861 i c g 
 Dolichopus maculicornis Verrall, 1875
 Dolichopus maculipennis Zetterstedt, 1843 c g 
 Dolichopus maculitarsis Van Duzee, 1925 i c g 
 Dolichopus magnantenna James, 1939 i c g 
 Dolichopus makarovi Smirnov, 1948 c g
 Dolichopus malekii Grichanov, Khaghaninia & Gharajedaghi in Khaghaninia, Gharajedaghi & Grichanov, 2014 
 Dolichopus manicula Van Duzee, 1921 i c g 
 Dolichopus mannerheimi Zetterstedt, 1838 i c g 
 Dolichopus marginatus Aldrich, 1893 i c g 
 Dolichopus marshalli Parent, 1933 c g
 Dolichopus martynovi Stackelberg, 1930 c g
 Dolichopus mediicornis Verrall, 1875 c g
 Dolichopus mediovenus Negrobov, 1977 c g
 Dolichopus medvedevi Grichanov, 2009 
 Dolichopus meigeni Loew, 1857 c g
 Dolichopus melanderi Van Duzee, 1921 c g 
 Dolichopus melanocerus Loew, 1864 i c g 
 Dolichopus melanopus Meigen, 1824 c g 
 Dolichopus mercieri Parent, 1929 i c g 
 Dolichopus meridionalis Yang, 1996 c g 
 Dolichopus meyeri Yang, 1998 c g 
 Dolichopus microstigma Stackelberg, 1930
 Dolichopus migrans Zetterstedt, 1843 c g
 Dolichopus miki Parent, 1938 c g
 Dolichopus monarchus Harmston, 1968 i c g 
 Dolichopus mongolicus Parent, 1926 c g
 Dolichopus monochaetus Smirnov, 1948 c g
 Dolichopus monticola Van Duzee, 1921 i c g 
 Dolichopus multisetosus Van Duzee, 1921 i c g 
 Dolichopus myosotus Osten Sacken, 1887 i c g 
 Dolichopus naglisi Maslova, Selivanova & Negrobov, 2011 
 Dolichopus nartshukae Negrobov, Selivanova & Maslova, 2012 
 Dolichopus nataliae Stackelberg, 1930 c g
 Dolichopus nebulosus Smirnov, 1948 c g
 Dolichopus negrobovi Gosseries, 1989 c g
 Dolichopus neomexicanus Harmston, 1951 i c g 
 Dolichopus nepalensis Yang, Saigusa & Masunaga, 2004 c g 
 Dolichopus nigrescens Becker, 1917 c g
 Dolichopus nigricauda Van Duzee, 1921 i c g 
 Dolichopus nigricercus Negrobov, Selivanova & Maslova, 2018
 Dolichopus nigricornis Meigen, 1824 i c g 
 Dolichopus nigricoxa Van Duzee, 1926 i c g 
 Dolichopus nigrilineatus Van Duzee, 1925 i c g 
 Dolichopus nigrimanus Van Duzee, 1921 i c g 
 Dolichopus nigripes Fallén, 1823 c g
 Dolichopus nigropleurus Harmston, 1966 i c g 
 Dolichopus nimbatus Parent, 1927 c g
 Dolichopus nitidus Fallén, 1823 c g
 Dolichopus nivalis Vaillant, 1973 c g
 Dolichopus nodipennis Van Duzee, 1921 i c g 
 Dolichopus nomadus Harmston & Knowlton, 1942 i c g
 Dolichopus notatus Staeger, 1842 c g
 Dolichopus nubifer Van Duzee, 1921 
 Dolichopus nubilus Meigen, 1824 g 
 Dolichopus nudus Loew, 1864 i c g 
 Dolichopus obcordatus Aldrich, 1893 i c g 
 Dolichopus obscuripes Stackelberg, 1926 c g
 Dolichopus obsoletus Van Duzee, 1921 i c g 
 Dolichopus occidentalis Aldrich, 1893 i c g b 
 Dolichopus oganesiani Negrobov, 1986 c g 
 Dolichopus omnivagus Van Duzee, 1921 i c g 
 Dolichopus opportunus Van Duzee, 1921 i c g 
 Dolichopus oregonensis Van Duzee, 1927 i c g 
 Dolichopus orichalceus Gosseries, 1989 c g 
 Dolichopus orientalis Parent, 1927 c g
 Dolichopus ornamentarsis Negrobov & Barkalov, 2008 
 Dolichopus ornatipennis Van Duzee, 1921 i c g 
 Dolichopus ovatus Loew, 1861 i c g b 
 Dolichopus oxianus Stackelberg, 1930 c g
 Dolichopus pachycnemus Loew, 1861 i c g 
 Dolichopus packardi Van Duzee, 1921 i c g 
 Dolichopus palaestricus Loew, 1864 i c g 
 Dolichopus paluster Melander & Brues, 1900 i c g 
 Dolichopus pamiricus Negrobov, 1976 c g
 Dolichopus pantomimus Melander & Brues, 1900 i c g b 
 Dolichopus partitus Melander & Brues, 1900 i c g 
 Dolichopus parvicornis Van Duzee, 1921 i c g 
 Dolichopus parvimanus Van Duzee, 1933 i c g 
 Dolichopus penicillatus Van Duzee, 1921 i c g 
 Dolichopus pennatus Meigen, 1824 c g 
 Dolichopus pensus Aldrich, 1922 i c g 
 Dolichopus pernix Melander & Brues, 1900 i c g 
 Dolichopus perplexus Van Duzee, 1923 i c g 
 Dolichopus perversus Loew, 1871 c g
 Dolichopus phaeopus Haliday in Walker, 1851 c g
 Dolichopus phyllocerus Vockeroth, 1962 i c g 
 Dolichopus picipes Meigen, 1824 c g 
 Dolichopus pilatus Van Duzee, 1921 i c g 
 Dolichopus pingreensis James, 1939 i c g 
 Dolichopus planitarsis Fallén, 1823 c g
 Dolichopus platychaetus Negrobov & Barkalov, 1977 c g
 Dolichopus platylepis Negrobov & Grichanov, 1979 c g
 Dolichopus plumipes (Scopoli, 1763) i c g b 
 Dolichopus plumitarsis Fallén, 1823 i c g 
 Dolichopus plumosus Aldrich, 1893 i c g 
 Dolichopus polleti Meuffels & Grootaert, 1989 c g
 Dolichopus pollex Osten Sacken, 1877 i c g 
 Dolichopus polychaetus Negrobov, 1973 c g
 Dolichopus popularis Wiedemann, 1817 c g
 Dolichopus porphyrops Van Duzee, 1921 i c g b 
 Dolichopus portentosus Negrobov, 1973 c g
 Dolichopus pospelovi Smirnov, 1948 c g
 Dolichopus postocularis Negrobov, 1977 c g
 Dolichopus praeustus Loew, 1862 i c g 
 Dolichopus pseudomigrans Ringdahl, 1928 c g
 Dolichopus ptenopedilus Meuffels, 1981 c g
 Dolichopus puberiseta Parent, 1934 i c g 
 Dolichopus pugil Loew, 1866 i c g 
 Dolichopus pulchrimanus (Bigot, 1888) i c g b 
 Dolichopus pullus Smirnov, 1948 c g
 Dolichopus punctum Meigen, 1824 c g
 Dolichopus pyrenaicus Parent, 1920 c g
 Dolichopus qinghensis Zhang, Yang & Grootaert, 2004 c g 
 Dolichopus quadrilamellatus Loew, 1864 i c g 
 Dolichopus ramifer Loew, 1861 i c g b 
 Dolichopus recticosta Aldrich, 1922 i c g 
 Dolichopus reflectus Aldrich, 1893 i c g b 
 Dolichopus reichardti Stackelberg, 1930 c g
 Dolichopus remipes Wahlberg, 1839 i c g b 
 Dolichopus remotus Walker, 1849 i c g 
 Dolichopus remus Van Duzee, 1921 i c g 
 Dolichopus renidescens Melander & Brues, 1900 i c g 
 Dolichopus retinens Van Duzee, 1921 i c g b 
 Dolichopus rezvorum Stackelberg, 1930 c g
 Dolichopus ringdahli Stackelberg, 1930 c g
 Dolichopus roborovskii Stackelberg, 1930 c g
 Dolichopus robustus Stackelberg, 1928 c g
 Dolichopus romanovi Smirnov & Negrobov, 1973 c g
 Dolichopus rotundipennis Loew, 1848 c g
 Dolichopus ruchini Negrobov, Maslova & Selivanova, 2020
 Dolichopus ruficornis Loew, 1861 i c g 
 Dolichopus rufitinctus Becker, 1917 c g
 Dolichopus rupestris Haliday, 1833 i c g 
 Dolichopus ruthei Loew, 1847 c g
 Dolichopus sabinus Haliday, 1838 c g
 Dolichopus sagittarius Loew, 1848 c g 
 Dolichopus salictorum Loew, 1871 c g
 Dolichopus saphirus Becker, 1922 c g
 Dolichopus sarotes Loew, 1866 i c g 
 Dolichopus satoi Negrobov, Fursov & Selivanova, 2014 
 Dolichopus saxicola Smirnov, 1948 c g
 Dolichopus scapularis Loew, 1861 i c g b 
 Dolichopus scopifer James, 1939 i c g 
 Dolichopus scutopilosus Parent, 1933 c g
 Dolichopus sedulus Van Duzee, 1921 i c g 
 Dolichopus segregatus Parent, 1929 c g
 Dolichopus selivanovae Negrobov & Barkalov, 2010 
 Dolichopus serratus Van Duzee, 1921 i c g 
 Dolichopus setifer Loew, 1861 i c g b 
 Dolichopus setiger Negrobov, 1973 c g
 Dolichopus setimanus Smirnov, 1948 c g
 Dolichopus setitarsus Negrobov & Barkalov, 1977
 Dolichopus setosus Loew, 1862 i c g 
 Dolichopus sexarticulatus Loew, 1864 i c g b 
 Dolichopus shamshevi Negrobov, Selivanova & Maslova, 2014 
 Dolichopus shantaricus Stackelberg, 1933 c g
 Dolichopus sharovi Smirnov, 1948 c g
 Dolichopus shastaensis Harmston, 1966 i c g 
 Dolichopus shelfordi Curran in Van Duzee & Curran, 1934 i c g 
 Dolichopus shii Yang, 1996 c g 
 Dolichopus sibiricus Stackelberg, 1929 c g
 Dolichopus sicardi Parent, 1920 c g
 Dolichopus sicarius Van Duzee, 1921 i c g b 
 Dolichopus siculus Loew, 1859 c g
 Dolichopus sidorenkoi Negrobov, Maslova & Selivanova, 2011 
 Dolichopus signatus Meigen, 1824 c g 
 Dolichopus signifer Haliday, 1838 c g
 Dolichopus silvicola Harmston, 1951 i c g 
 Dolichopus simillimus Parent, 1933 c g
 Dolichopus simius Parent, 1927 c g
 Dolichopus simplex Meigen, 1824 c g 
 Dolichopus simplicipes Aldrich, 1922 i c g 
 Dolichopus simulans Van Duzee, 1926 i c g 
 Dolichopus simulator Parent, 1926 c g
 Dolichopus sincerus Melander, 1900 i c g b 
 Dolichopus sinualaris Harmston, 1966 i c g 
 Dolichopus sinuatus Negrobov & Barkalov, 1978 c g
 Dolichopus skifiensis Negrobov, Selivanova & Maslova, 2013 
 Dolichopus slossonae Van Duzee, 1921 i c g 
 Dolichopus smirnovianus Negrobov, 1977 c g
 Dolichopus smithae Harmston, 1966 i c g 
 Dolichopus socer Loew, 1871 c g
 Dolichopus socius Loew, 1862 i c g 
 Dolichopus soldatovi Negrobov, Selivanova & Maslova in Negrobov, Maslova & Selivanova, 2013 
 Dolichopus solidus Van Duzee, 1921 i c g 
 Dolichopus sordidatus Van Duzee, 1921 i c g 
 Dolichopus speciosus Van Duzee, 1921 i c g 
 Dolichopus sphaeristes Brues, 1901 i c g 
 Dolichopus sphagnatilis Vaillant in Vaillant & Brunhes, 1980 c g
 Dolichopus spinuliformis Maslova, Negrobov & Selivanova, 2012
 Dolichopus sporadicus Harmston & Knowlton, 1942 i c g 
 Dolichopus squamicilliatus Harmston, 1966 i c g 
 Dolichopus squamosus Van Duzee, 1921 i c g 
 Dolichopus stackelbergi Smirnov, 1948 c g
 Dolichopus steini Becker, 1917 c g
 Dolichopus stenhammari Zetterstedt, 1843 i c g
 Dolichopus steyskali Robinson, 1964 i c g 
 Dolichopus storozhenkoi Negrobov, Selivanova & Maslova, 2016 
 Dolichopus stricklandi Harmston & Knowlton, 1939 i c g 
 Dolichopus strigipes Verrall, 1875 c g
 Dolichopus subapicalis Yang, 1998 c g
 Dolichopus subciliatus Loew, 1864 i c g 
 Dolichopus subcostatus Van Duzee, 1930 i c g 
 Dolichopus sublimbatus Becker, 1917 c g
 Dolichopus subpennatus d'Assis-Fonseca, 1976 c g
 Dolichopus subspina Van Duzee, 1928 i c g 
 Dolichopus subspretus Negrobov, 1979 c g
 Dolichopus sufflavus Van Duzee, 1921 i c g 
 Dolichopus superbus Van Duzee, 1921 i c g b 
 Dolichopus sychevskajae Negrobov & Barkalov, 1978 c g
 Dolichopus syracusanus Becker, 1917 c g
 Dolichopus syriacus Becker, 1917 c g
 Dolichopus taigensis Smirnov, 1948 c g
 Dolichopus taimyricus Selivanova, Negrobov & Barkalov, 2012 
 Dolichopus talus Van Duzee, 1921 i c g 
 Dolichopus tanythrix Loew, 1869 c g
 Dolichopus tarsipictis Harmston & Knowlton, 1963 i c g 
 Dolichopus tener Loew, 1861 i c g 
 Dolichopus tenuicornis Parent, 1927 c g
 Dolichopus tenuimanus Van Duzee, 1932 i c g 
 Dolichopus tenuipes Aldrich, 1894 i c g b 
 Dolichopus terminalis Loew, 1866 i c g 
 Dolichopus terminasianae Negrobov, Selivanova & Maslova, 2011 
 Dolichopus tetricus Loew, 1864 i c g 
 Dolichopus tewoensis Yang, 1998 c g 
 Dolichopus theodori Meuffels & Grootaert, 1999 c g 
 Dolichopus tokyoensis Negrobov, Kumazawa & Tago in Negrobov, Kumazawa, Tago & Maslova, 2015 
 Dolichopus tonsus Loew, 1861 i c g 
 Dolichopus townsendi Aldrich, 1922 i c g 
 Dolichopus triangularis Smirnov, 1948 c g
 Dolichopus trisetosus Van Duzee, 1921 i c g 
 Dolichopus trivialis Haliday, 1832 c g 
 Dolichopus tschernovi Negrobov, Barkalov & Selivanova, 2014 
 Dolichopus tumefactus Negrobov, 1973 c g
 Dolichopus tumicosta Negrobov, Grichanov & Barkalov, 2009 g 
 Dolichopus tundrensis Barkalov, Negrobov & Grichanov, 2009 g 
 Dolichopus turanicus Stackelberg, 1930 c g
 Dolichopus turkestani Becker, 1917 c g
 Dolichopus ukokensis Negrobov & Barkalov, 2009
 Dolichopus ulaganensis Negrobov, Barkalov & Maslova, 2019
 Dolichopus uliginosus Van Duzee, 1923 i c g 
 Dolichopus umbrosus Van Duzee, 1921 i c g 
 Dolichopus ungulatus (Linnaeus, 1758) i c g
 Dolichopus uniseta Stackelberg, 1929 c g
 Dolichopus uralensis Stackelberg, 1930 c g
 Dolichopus urbanus Meigen, 1824 c g 
 Dolichopus ussuriensis Stackelberg, 1930 c g
 Dolichopus utahensis Harmston & Knowlton, 1943 i c g 
 Dolichopus uxorcula Van Duzee, 1921 i c g 
 Dolichopus vadimi Negrobov, Selivanova & Maslova, 2012 
 Dolichopus vadimiani Negrobov & Barkalov, 1978 c g
 Dolichopus vaillanti Parent, 1927 c g
 Dolichopus vanduzeei Curran, 1922 i c g 
 Dolichopus variabilis Loew, 1861 i c g b 
 Dolichopus varians Smirnov, 1948 c g
 Dolichopus varipes Coquillett, 1900 i c g 
 Dolichopus vegetus Harmston, 1952 i c g 
 Dolichopus venturii Negrobov, Selivanova & Maslova, 2014 
 Dolichopus verae Negrobov, 1977 c g
 Dolichopus vernaae Harmston & Knowlton, 1940 i c g 
 Dolichopus versutus Van Duzee, 1921 i c g 
 Dolichopus vicfursovi Negrobov, Kumazawa & Tago in Negrobov, Kumazawa, Tago & Maslova, 2015 
 Dolichopus victoris Stackelberg, 1933 c g
 Dolichopus vigilans Aldrich, 1893 i c g b 
 Dolichopus violovitshi Negrobov, 1977 c g
 Dolichopus virga Coquillett, 1910 i c g 
 Dolichopus virginiensis Van Duzee, 1921 i c g 
 Dolichopus virgultorum Haliday in Walker, 1851 c g
 Dolichopus viridis Van Duzee, 1921 i c g 
 Dolichopus vitripennis Meigen, 1824 c g 
 Dolichopus wahlbergi Zetterstedt, 1843 c g
 Dolichopus walkeri Van Duzee, 1921 i c g 
 Dolichopus wheeleri (Melander & Brues, 1900) i c g 
 Dolichopus xanthocnemus Loew, 1864 i c g 
 Dolichopus xanthopyga Stackelberg, 1930 c g
 Dolichopus xinjianganus Yang, 1998 
 Dolichopus xinyuanus Yang, 1998 
 Dolichopus yangi Zhang & Yang, 2008 
 Dolichopus yunnanus Parent, 1930 c g
 Dolichopus zaitzevi Grichanov, 2012 
 Dolichopus zakhvatkini Maslova, Selivanova & Negrobov, 2011 
 Dolichopus zernyi Parent, 1927 c g
 Dolichopus zetterstedti Stenhammar, 1851 c g
 Dolichopus zhejiangensis Yang & Li, 1998 c g
 Dolichopus zhelochovzevi Negrobov, 1976 c g
 Dolichopus zhongdianus Yang, 1998 c g
 Dolichopus zhoui Zhang, Yang & Grootaert, 2004 c g 
 Dolichopus zimini Stackelberg, 1930 c g
 Dolichopus zlobini Selivanova, Negrobov & Barkalov, 2012 
 Dolichopus zurikovi Negrobov, Selivanova & Maslova, 2012 
 Dolichopus zygomus Harmston, 1966 i c g 
 †Dolichopus georgi Meuffels & Grootaert, 1999 
 †Dolichopus miluus Forster, 1891
 †Dolichopus morbosus Meunier, 1907
 †Dolichopus scitus Statz, 1940
 †Dolichopus smicrus Meuffels & Grootaert, 1999 
 †Dolichopus spinosus Statz, 1940
 †Dolichopus titanus (Meunier, 1907)

Unrecognised species:

 Dolichopus adjacens (Walker, 1849) c g 
 Dolichopus alpinus Meigen, 1824 
 Dolichopus analis Macquart, 1834
 Dolichopus bicolor Macquart, 1827
 Dolichopus collinus Philippi, 1865
 Dolichopus concolor Philippi, 1865
 Dolichopus confinis Walker, 1849 i c g 
 Dolichopus contingens Walker, 1852
 Dolichopus crisatus (Fabricius, 1794)
 Dolichopus discessus Walker, 1849 i c g 
 Dolichopus distractus Walker, 1849 i c g 
 Dolichopus dubiosus Philippi, 1865
 Dolichopus exclusus Walker, 1849 i c g 
 Dolichopus flavifrons Philippi, 1865 (acalyptrate?)
 Dolichopus fuscipennis Wiedemann, 1824 c g (subfamily Sciapodinae)
 Dolichopus heydeni Wiedemann, 1830
 Dolichopus inornatus Philippi, 1865 (acalyptrate?)
 Dolichopus longicollis Meigen, 1824 
 Dolichopus longipes Philippi, 1865 (Sympycnus?)
 Dolichopus misellus Boheman, 1853
 Dolichopus nigripes (Fabricius, 1794) (Chrysotus laesus (Wiedemann, 1817)?)
 Dolichopus nitens (Fabricius, 1805) c g (subfamily Sciapodinae)
 Dolichopus parvus Macquart, 1834
 Dolichopus plebeius Meigen, 1824  (Dolichopus linearis Meigen, 1824?)
 Dolichopus praemissus Walker, 1859 c
 Dolichopus pulcher Walker, 1852 i c g 
 Dolichopus punctiger Philippi, 1865 (Tachytrechus?)
 Dolichopus separatus Walker, 1849 i c g 
 Dolichopus soccatus Walker, 1849 i c g 
 Dolichopus sublamellatus Macquart, 1827
 Dolichopus terminatus Walker, 1849 i c g 

Data sources: i = ITIS, c = Catalogue of Life, g = GBIF, b = Bugguide.net

Synonyms
The following species are synonyms or have been moved to other genera:
 Dolichopus aemulus Loew, 1859 c g: synonym of Dolichopus popularis Wiedemann, 1817
 Dolichopus afflictus (Osten Sacken, 1877) c g: synonym of Dolichopus lamellicornis (Thomson, 1869)
 Dolichopus alberecrus Gunther, 1982 i c g: synonym of Dolichopus scapularis Loew, 1861
 Dolichopus angustinervis Becker, 1922 c g: synonym of Dolichopus exsul Aldrich, 1922
 Dolichopus annaclareii Gunther, 1982 i c g: synonym of Dolichopus variabilis Loew, 1861
 Dolichopus annulipes Zetterstedt, 1838: synonym of Dolichopus stenhammari Zetterstedt, 1843
 Dolichopus atritibialis Zetterstedt, 1859 c g: synonym of Dolichopus urbanus Meigen, 1824
 Dolichopus balius Meuffels, 1982 c g: synonym of Dolichopus nimbatus Parent, 1927
 Dolichopus brachyurus Zetterstedt, 1859: synonym of Dolichopus fraterculus Zetterstedt, 1843
 Dolichopus consimilis Wahlberg, 1850 c g: synonym of Dolichopus picipes Meigen, 1824
 Dolichopus cruralis Wahlberg, 1850 c g: synonym of Dolichopus lepidus Staeger, 1842
 Dolichopus exiguus Zetterstedt, 1843: synonym of Dolichopus arbustorum Stannius, 1831
 Dolichopus frosti Runyon, 2008 c g: synonym of Dolichopus sincerus Melander, 1900
 Dolichopus fulgidus Fallén, 1823: synonym of Dolichopus campestris Meigen, 1824
 Dolichopus gracilis Aldrich, 1893 c g: synonym of Dolichopus variabilis Loew, 1861
 Dolichopus hurleyi Runyon, 2008 c g: synonym of Dolichopus dorycerus Loew, 1864
 Dolichopus inconspicuus Zetterstedt, 1843: synonym of Dolichopus simplex Meigen, 1824
 Dolichopus lantsovi Negrobov, Grichanov & Barkalov, 2009 g: synonym of Dolichopus humilis Van Duzee, 1921
 Dolichopus lapponicus Becker, 1917: synonym of Dolichopus lepidus Staeger, 1842
 Dolichopus luteitarsis Parent, 1932 c g: synonym of Dolichopus flavocrinitus Becker, 1902
 Dolichopus micropygus Wahlberg, 1850 i c g: synonym of Dolichopus fraterculus Zetterstedt, 1843
 Dolichopus modestus Wahlberg, 1850 c g: synonym of Dolichopus simplex Meigen, 1824
 Dolichopus mucronatus Becker, 1917 c g: synonym of Dolichopus discimanus Wahlberg, 1850
 Dolichopus occultus Becker, 1917 c g: synonym of Dolichopus arbustorum Stannius, 1831
 Dolichopus parvicaudatus Zetterstedt, 1843 c g: synonym of Dolichopus plumipes (Scopoli, 1763)
 Dolichopus pectinitarsis Stenhammar, 1851 c g: synonym of Dolichopus plumipes (Scopoli, 1763)
 Dolichopus propinquus Zetterstedt, 1852 c g: synonym of Dolichopus trivialis Haliday, 1832
 Dolichopus spretus Loew, 1871 c g: synonym of Dolichopus vitripennis Meigen, 1824
 Dolichopus subimmaculatus Kazerani, Pollet & Khaghaninia, 2017 g: synonym of Dolichopus perversus Loew, 1871
 Dolichopus thalhammeri Knezy, 1929 g: synonym of Dolichopus nimbatus Parent, 1927

The following species were renamed:
 Dolichopus agilis Aldrich, 1893 (preoccupied by Dolichopus agilis Meigen, 1824): renamed to Dolichopus coloradensis Aldrich, 1893
 Dolichopus breviciliatus Van Duzee, 1933 (preoccupied by Dolichopus breviciliatus Van Duzee, 1930): renamed to Dolichopus brevipilosus Van Duzee, 1933
 Dolichopus ciliatus (Aldrich, 1893) (preoccupied by Dolichopus ciliatus Walker, 1849 [= Dolichopus plumipes (Scopoli, 1763)]): renamed to Dolichopus penicillatus Van Duzee, 1921
 Dolichopus consobrinus Zetterstedt, 1859 c g (preoccupied by Dolichopus consobrinus Haliday, 1851): renamed to Dolichopus maculicornis Verrall, 1875
 Dolichopus cupreus Say, 1823 (preoccupied by Dolichopus cupreus Fallén, 1823): renamed to Dolichopus cuprinus Wiedemann, 1830
 Dolichopus migrans Becker, 1917 (preoccupied by Dolichopus migrans Zetterstedt, 1843): renamed to Dolichopus pseudomigrans Ringdahl, 1928
 Dolichopus misellus Melander, 1900 (preoccupied by Dolichopus misellus Boheman, 1853): renamed to Dolichopus perplexus Van Duzee, 1923
 Dolichopus nigrilamellatus Becker, 1917 c g (preoccupied by Dolichopus nigrilamellatus Macquart, 1827): renamed to Dolichopus theodori Meuffels & Grootaert, 1999
 Dolichopus nitens Stannius, 1831 (preoccupied by Dolichopus nitens Fabricius, 1805): renamed to Dolichopus friedrichi Meuffels & Grootaert, 1999
 Dolichopus pallidus Negrobov, 1991 c g (preoccupied by Dolichopus pallidus Fallén, 1823): renamed to Dolichopus negrobovi Gosseries, 1989
 Dolichopus propinquus (Melander & Brues, 1900) (preoccupied by Dolichopus propinquus Zetterstedt, 1852 [= Dolichopus trivialis Haliday, 1832]): renamed to Dolichopus bruesi Van Duzee, 1921
 Dolichopus thalassinus Mik, 1880 (preoccupied by Dolichopus thalassinus Haliday, 1832): renamed to Dolichopus miki Parent, 1938
 Dolichopus turkestani Stackelberg, 1927 (preoccupied by Dolichopus turkestani Becker, 1917): renamed to Dolichopus turanicus Stackelberg, 1930
 Dolichopus vittatus Loew, 1861 i c g (preoccupied by Dolichopus vittatus Wiedemann, 1819): renamed to Dolichopus orichalceus Gosseries, 1989

The following species were moved to another genus:
 Dolichopus diaphanus Fabricius, 1805: moved to Argyra (as unrecognised species)
 Dolichopus ultimus (Parent, 1935) c g: moved to Hercostomus

The following species are placed in Lichtwardtia, but may be considered valid if Lichtwardtia is a synonym of Dolichopus (as in Scott E. Brooks (2005)):
 Dolichopus aethiopicus (Bezzi, 1906) c g
 Dolichopus aldabrensis (Meuffels & Grootaert, 2007) c g
 Dolichopus angularis Macquart, 1842 c g
 Dolichopus angulicornis (Grichanov, 2004) c g
 Dolichopus clypeatus (Grichanov, 2004) c g
 Dolichopus dentalis (Zhang, Masunaga & Yang, 2009) c
 Dolichopus emelyanovi (Grichanov, 1998) c g
 Dolichopus formosana (Enderlein, 1912)
 Dolichopus fractinervis (Parent, 1929) c g
 Dolichopus hilgerae (Grichanov, 2004) c g
 Dolichopus hirsutisetus (De Meijere, 1916)
 Dolichopus hollisi (Grichanov, 1998) c g
 Dolichopus maculatus (Parent, 1936) c g
 Dolichopus melanesiana Bickel, 2008 g
 Dolichopus minusculus (Parent, 1934) c
 Dolichopus mironovi (Grichanov, 1998) c
 Dolichopus nigrifacies (Grichanov, 2004) c g
 Dolichopus nigrotorquatus (Parent, 1937) c g
 Dolichopus nikolaevae (Grichanov, 1998) c g
 Dolichopus sukharevae (Grichanov, 1998) c g
 Dolichopus tikhonovi (Grichanov, 1998) c g
 Dolichopus ziczac Wiedemann, 1824 c g

If Lichtwardtia is a synonym of Dolichopus, then the following combinations would be synonyms of the species listed above:

 Dolichopus antennatus (Vanschuytbroeck, 1951) c g: synonym of Dolichopus angularis (Macquart, 1842)
 Dolichopus kivuensis (Vanschuytbroeck, 1951) c: synonym of Dolichopus fractinervis (Parent, 1929)
 Dolichopus metallica (Bezzi, 1908) c g: synonym of Dolichopus angularis (Macquart, 1842)
 Dolichopus microlepis (Parent, 1939) c g: synonym of Dolichopus fractinervis (Parent, 1929)
 Dolichopus minutus (Vanschuytbroeck, 1951) c g: synonym of Dolichopus fractinervis (Parent, 1929)
 Dolichopus taiwanensis (Zhang, Masunaga & Yang, 2009) c g: synonym of Dolichopus formosana (Enderlein, 1912)
 Dolichopus violaceus (Curran, 1926) c g: synonym of Dolichopus angularis (Macquart, 1842)
 Dolichopus wittei (Vanschuytbroeck, 1951) c: synonym of Dolichopus maculatus (Parent, 1936)

Data sources: i = ITIS, c = Catalogue of Life, g = GBIF, b = Bugguide.net

Miscellaneous
The following are listed on online data sources, but are actually subspecies or variations of other species:
 Dolichopus clarior Parent, 1936 c g: Subspecies of Dolichopus simulator Parent, 1926
 Dolichopus cognatus (Melander & Brues, 1900) c g: Variation of Dolichopus latipes (Loew, 1861)
 Dolichopus fusiformis Becker, 1917: Subspecies of Dolichopus clavipes Haliday, 1832
 Dolichopus nigrifemur Stackelberg, 1930 c g: Variation of Dolichopus fraterculus Zetterstedt, 1843
 Dolichopus robertsoni Curran, 1923 c g: Variation of Dolichopus amnicola (Melander & Brues, 1900)
 Dolichopus subdirectus Van Duzee, 1921 c g: Variation of Dolichopus sincerus Melander, 1900

The following are listed on online data sources, but are actually misspellings of other species (including synonyms):
 Dolichopus affictus (Osten Sacken, 1877) i g: Actually Dolichopus afflictus
 Dolichopus alexandri Stackelberg, 1930 c g: Actually Dolichopus alexanderi
 Dolichopus andualusiacus Strobl, 1899 c g: Actually Dolichopus andalusiacus
 Dolichopus argyrotarsus Wahlberg, 1851 c g: Actually Dolichopus argyrotarsis
 Dolichopus bonsdorfii Frey, 1915 c g: Actually Dolichopus bonsdorffi
 Dolichopus czekanowskii Stackelberg, 1928 i c g: Actually Dolichopus czekanovskii
 Dolichopus emelijanovi Stackelberg, 1930 c: Actually Dolichopus emeljanovi
 Dolichopus frifolini Stackelberg, 1928 c g: Actually Dolichopus fridolini
 Dolichopus fusciformis Becker, 1917 c g: Actually Dolichopus fusiformis
 Dolichopus hirstitarsis Harmston, 1952 i c g: Actually Dolichopus hirsutitarsis
 Dolichopus hirsutisetis (De Meijere, 1916) c g: Actually Dolichopus hirsutisetus
 Dolichopus howjingleci Olejnicek, 2002 g: Actually Dolichopus howjingleei
 Dolichopus longicotalis Negrobov & Barkalov, 1978 c g: Actually Dolichopus longicostalis
 Dolichopus marcrostigma Stackelberg, 1930 c g: Actually Dolichopus microstigma
 Dolichopus nigriscens Becker, 1917 g: Actually Dolichopus nigrescens
 Dolichopus nubier Van Duzee, 1921 i g: Actually Dolichopus nubifer
 Dolichopus nubilis Meigen, 1824 c g: Actually Dolichopus nubilus
 Dolichopus setitarsis Negrobov & Barkalov, 1977 c g: Actually Dolichopus setitarsus

Data sources: i = ITIS, c = Catalogue of Life, g = GBIF, b = Bugguide.net

References

Dolichopus